Ironías (Ironies) is the fifth studio album by Puerto Rican salsero Víctor Manuelle. Released in 1998, Ironias was successful in both the Top Latin Albums and Tropical Albums peaking at #4 and #1 respectively.

Singles
Three singles were produced for the album. The first single Se Me Rompe el Alma (It Breaks My Heart) peaked #1 on the Latin Tropical Airplay charts and #3 on Hot Latin Tracks. The second single, Que Habria Sido de Mi (What Would Be of Me), peaked #1 on Latin Tropical Airplay and #5 on Hot Latin Tracks. The third single, Que Te Han Dicho (What I've told you) only peaked #16 on Latin Tropical Airplay and #35 on Hot Latin Tracks.

Track listing
 Se Me Rompe el Alma - 4:56
 Qué Habría Sido de Mi - 4:52
 Y Después de Nuevos Amigos - 5:10
 Mentiras - 4:53
 Al Igual Que Yo - 5:07
 La Dueña de Mis Amores - 5:01 
 Qué Te Han Dicho - 5:04
 Hay Cariño - 4:24
 No Te Desprecio - 4:50

Chart position

Album

See also
List of number-one Billboard Tropical Albums from the 1990s

References

1998 albums
Víctor Manuelle albums
Sony Discos albums